The 6000-series was a series of Chicago "L" car built between 1950 and 1959 by the St. Louis Car Company.

Design
In 1947–1948 the CTA received four three-car articulated trainsets, 5001–5004, to test PCC technology in rapid transit use. Two sets of cars were built by Pullman, two by St. Louis Car, with equipment supplied by competing suppliers, in order to test them directly against each other. The 6000-series was designed with knowledge from the 5000-series.

Bodies
5000-series bodies had a curved profile previously used by North Shore Line and then Chicago, Aurora & Elgin cars which operated on the "L". The floor width was the  needed for platform clearance, then above the sides curved outward, so the car was wider at seat level. This profile was used, 6000-series cars were  wider at the seats than the floor. Blinker doors, which swing on an arc and open inward, were also successful and were used in the 6000-series.

Articulation was not repeated; the 6000s were individual cars semi-permanently attached in pairs. The outside end of both cars had a cab, making a two-car double-ended arrangement. This has become the CTA standard.

St Louis built all 6000-series cars, as well as the 1-50 series, many with components salvaged from Pullman streetcars, starting with car No 6201 and continuing until the end of production.

Driveline
The 5000s had modified Clark and St Louis trucks with  wheels for speeds of x. The 6000s had more standard streetcar trucks, with  wheels.  These had a top speed of 50, which was adequate for CTA needs until the high-speed Skokie Swift shuttle started in 1964.

The first 200 cars were built with new components, including Clark B-2 trucks, the next 310 cars had Clark B-2s salvaged from Pullman streetcars, and the final 210, plus most of the similar 1-50 class, had St Louis B-3s salvaged from St Louis streetcars.

All cars had Westinghouse XDA1 controls. 6001–6488 had Westinghouse 1432 motors, all following cars had General Electric 1220 motors. Both type motors delivered . The exceptions are test cars 6127–6130, which had non-standard equipment and higher performance.

Routes
The 6000-series became the standard of the system, and were used almost everywhere. In 1975 there were still over 700 6000s in service.

Initially, all of the first 130 6000s were assigned to the Logan Square line. The North-South and Ravenswood lines had 6000s in service in 1952 (with the 4000-series cars taking the 6000s' place on the Logan Square line); other lines (except the Lake Street line, presumably due to width clearance issues on the at-grade section of the line west of Laramie Avenue, which was also powered by overhead wire) received cars when they became available.

Because of overhead wire, no 6000s were used on the Skokie or Evanston lines, except 6127–6130, which received trolley poles for express service on the Evanston line. (The western section of the Lake line was elevated in 1962; however, it remained equipped entirely with 4000s until the arrival of the 2000-series cars from Pullman-Standard in 1964.) Two of the routes that the 6000s were not used on were served by their single car variants, the 1-50 series. The Evanston line began to receive additional 6000s after it converted entirely from overhead wire to third rail in 1973.

When the Dan Ryan line was opened in 1969, newer cars were assigned there, but 6000s were sometimes used for special movements.

CTA sold some of the cars to SEPTA for use on the Norristown High Speed Line during the delay of the N-5 car delivery.

Retirement

The last of the 6000-series cars were retired on December 4, 1992; the oldest had a service life of 42 years.

Several cars have been preserved:
6101-6102, 6711-6712, found on CTA property for preservation as part of the CTA's Heritage Fleet.
6599-6600, stored at the Seashore Trolley Museum, pending restoration.
6719, used for the exhibit America on the Move at the National Museum of American History
6655-6656, 6461-6462, 6125-6126, preserved by the Illinois Railway Museum in Union, Illinois.

References

External links
6000-series Cars at Chicago-L.org

Chicago "L" rolling stock

Train-related introductions in 1950
Railway services discontinued in 1992
St. Louis multiple units